Gwenllian Elizabeth Fanny Morgan (9 April 1852 – 7 November 1939) was the first woman in Wales to hold the office of Mayor. She was also an antiquary and published books about her area of study. Morgan served as superintendent of Petitions and Treaties, World's Woman's Christian Temperance Union (W. C. T. U.); was a member of the Executive Committee of the National British Women's Temperance Association; and was the president of the Brecon Branch. She was a white ribbon worker for eleven years and took a deep interest in the work. Morgan organized the Polyglot Petition work in Great Britain and Ireland and filled the position of British Secretary for the World's W. C. T. U. Apart from this, she was in full sympathy with, and was long connected with active work for women generally, of political and suffrage lines.

Towards the end of her life, Morgan and Louise Imogen Guiney collaborated in writing historical notes about the works of Henry Vaughan. Their  work was published posthumously in 1947.

Early years
Gwenllian Elizabeth Fanny Morgan was born in Defynnog on 9 April 1852. She was the daughter of Philip Morgan, curate at Penpont and rector in Llanhamlach. After his death in 1868, she moved to Brecon.

Career
Morgan was very prominent in public life in her town and its area, especially with regard to education. She became the first woman in Wales to be elected to a municipal council, and the first woman in Wales to be a mayor, from 1910 to 1911 in Brecon. In 1912, over 900 women raised the money for the Liverpool artist Isaac Cooke to paint a full portrait of her. The painting recorded that she was the first woman mayor and that she was the "Coronation Mayor".

Morgan was interested in literature and contributed articles to Old Wales. A monthly magazine of antiquities for Wales and the Borders, edited by W. R. Williams of Talybont-on-Usk. Morgan was an admirer of the work of the metaphysical poet Henry Vaughan, who had lived near Brecon. She collaborated with Louise Imogen Guiney on a volume of Vaughan's work, with biographical sketch and historical notes, but these two died before finishing the job and it was taken over by Dr. F. E. Hutchinson. Hutchinson published a comprehensive book about Vaughan based on their work in 1947.

Morgan was honoured with an honorary MA degree from the University of Wales in 1925. She died on 7 November 1939 in Brecon.

References

 powysenc.weebly.com; accessed 1 July 2015

Attribution

Bibliography
 

1852 births
1939 deaths
19th-century Welsh people
19th-century Welsh women
20th-century antiquarians
20th-century British women politicians
20th-century Welsh politicians
20th-century Welsh writers
20th-century Welsh women writers
20th-century British non-fiction writers
Women mayors of places in Wales
Welsh antiquarians
People from Brecon
People from Powys
Mayors of places in Wales
British temperance activists